The Cabral-class ironclads were a pair of iron-hulled, armored corvettes originally ordered by Paraguay in 1864, but were sold to Brazil when Paraguay defaulted on the payments. Configured as central-battery ironclads, they served during the 1864–70 Paraguayan War between Brazil, Argentina and Uruguay against Paraguay.

Design and description
They displaced . The Cabral class had a pair of steam engines, each driving one propeller. Their crew consisted of 125 officers and enlisted men.

Cabral was armed with two 70-pounder Whitworth rifled muzzle-loading guns and two smoothbore 68-pounder guns, while Colombo had four 120-pounder Whitworth guns.

Ships

See also 
 List of ironclads

Footnotes

References
 
 

Ironclad warships of the Brazilian Navy
Corvettes of the Brazilian Navy